Blink Commerce Private Limited, d/b/a Blinkit and formerly Grofers, is an Indian instant delivery service. It was founded in December 2013 and is based out of Gurgaon.

Customers of the company use a mobile application to order groceries and essentials online. Blinkit's employees then secure the items from their warehouse and deliver the items to the consumer within 10 minutes. By November 2021, the company was delivering 1.25 lakhs order every day. Blinkit currently operates in more than 30 cities in India. As of 2021, the company has raised about  million from investors including SoftBank, Tiger Global and Sequoia Capital.

On 24 June 2022, Zomato announced its acquisition of Blinkit for US$568 million in an all-stock deal. The acquisition was completed on August 10, 2022.

History 
Blinkit was founded in December 2013 by Albinder Dhindsa and Saurabh Kumar as Grofers.  Having met each other while working for Cambridge Systematics during the late 2000s, they teamed up to enter the grocery delivery space. Their goal was to solve the problems (both on customer as well as merchant end) associated with the unorganized nature of the sector. The startup piloted in Delhi NCR before reaching other cities in India.

After seven years of operations as an online grocery delivery service, Blinkit  introduced express grocery delivery in India, by building dark stores across cities. In July 2021, the company reported delivering over 7000 groceries in 15 minutes in Gurgaon. A month later, in August 2021, it introduced 10-minute delivery in the top-12 cities, after completing over 20,000 under-15-minute deliveries per day across 10 cities. On December 13, 2021, Grofers changed its brand name to Blinkit in line with its vision to embrace quick-commerce.

On 10 March 2022 Blinkit fired 1,600 employees or 5% if its total workforce in an effort to cut burn rate, following this Zomato granted a US$150 million loan to Blinkit, during the same time zomato held discussion with Blinkit regarding a acquisition through share swap deal. Zomato had acquired a 10% stake in company the year prior.  Following numerous discussions on 24 June 2022, Zomato announced its acquisition of Blinkit for US$568 million in an all-stock deal. The acquisition was completed on August 10, 2022.

Services 
Blinkit primarily delivers groceries, fresh fruits,vegetables, meat, stationery, bakery items, personal care, baby care and pet care products, snacks, flowers, etc.

Criticism 
In August 2021, the company's 10-minute delivery service faced criticism with concerns raised over the safety of delivery partners. CEO Albinder Dhindsa, in a tweet, defended the mechanism behind express delivery and claimed that there had been zero accidents.

Funding rounds 
Source:

See also
 List of online grocers

References

External links

2022 mergers and acquisitions
Companies based in Gurgaon
Indian companies established in 2013
Retail companies established in 2013
Transport companies established in 2013
Internet properties established in 2013
Online grocers
Online retailers of India
Softbank portfolio companies
Privately held companies of India